The St. Dominic Cathedral  also called Cobán Cathedral is a religious building that is affiliated with the Catholic Church and is located in the town and municipality of Cobán in Alta Verapaz department of the Central American country of Guatemala.

The church is one of the oldest structures in the region which dates back to 1543 when it was built by Fray Melchor de Los Reyes being rebuilt later in 1741 and 1799. It was built next to a convent that was built in 1551.

The temple follows the Roman or Latin rite and is the mother of the Diocese of Verapaz (Dioecesis Verae Pacis) which was created in 1935 by Pope Pius XI by the Bull "quoties in regionibus".

It is under the pastoral responsibility of the Bishop Rodolfo Valenzuela Núñez.

See also
Roman Catholicism in Guatemala
St. Dominic

References

Roman Catholic cathedrals in Guatemala
Buildings and structures in Cobán
Roman Catholic churches completed in 1543
Roman Catholic churches completed in 1741
16th-century Roman Catholic church buildings in Guatemala